The 78th European Weightlifting Championships were held in A Coruña, Spain from April 14 to April 18, 1999. There were a total number of 144 competing athletes from 29 nations.

Medal overview

Men

Women

References
Results (sports123)
ewf

E
Weightlifting
Weightlifting
European Weightlifting Championships